Eo-Navia is one of eight comarca administrative divisions of Asturias, a province and an autonomous community in Spain. Within the area, Eonavian, a Galician dialect, is spoken. This administrative division should not be confused with the historical comarca of Eo-Navia or Old Common Council of Castropol.

The comarca of Eo-Navia is divided into 17 municipalities (in Asturian conceyos). From east to west, they are:
Valdés
Navia
Villayón
Coaña
Boal
Eilao
Pezós
Grandas de Salime
El Franco
Tapia
Samartín d'Ozcos
Santalla d'Ozcos
Vilanova d'Ozcos
Castropol
Veiga d'Eo
Santiso d'Abres
Taramundi

Comarcas of Asturias